The North Brock River is a tributary of the Brock River, Brock River, flowing into the Eeyou Istchee Baie-James, in Jamésie, in the administrative region of Nord-du-Québec, in the province of Quebec, in the Canada. The course of the river crosses successively the Assinica Wildlife Reserve and the township of La Rochette.

The upper part of the hydrographic slope of the "North Brock River" is accessible by a forest road from Chibougamau and going up to the North. The lower part is served by some forest roads that come from the south where passes route 113 which connects Lebel-sur-Quévillon to Chibougamau. This road goes south of Opémisca Lake.

The surface of the "Brock North River" is usually frozen from early November to mid-May, however, safe ice movement is generally from mid-November to mid-April.

Geography

Toponymy 
This hydronym evokes the memory of Reginald W. Brock, who, at the end of the 1896 geological exploration campaign, was assistant to Dr. Robert Bell of the Geological Survey of Canada, made a rapid geological reconnaissance of the road between the lakes Waswanipi Lake and Mistassini through the Waswanipi River, Chibougamau and Barlow River rivers and the Lake Waskonichi. Reginald W. Brock, Director of the Geological Survey of Canada, provided the work maps and survey instruments for the 1910 Chibougamau Geological Survey (Quebec) expedition.

The toponym "Brock River North" was formalized on December 5, 1968, at the Commission de toponymie du Québec, at the creation of this commission

See also

References 

Rivers of Nord-du-Québec
Nottaway River drainage basin
Eeyou Istchee James Bay